Latinus (Ancient Greek: Λατῖνος, Latînos, or Λατεῖνος, Lateînos) was a figure in both Greek and Roman mythology.  He is often associated with the heroes of the Trojan War, namely Odysseus and Aeneas.  Although his appearance in the Aeneid is irreconcilable with his appearance in Greek mythology, the two pictures are not so different that he cannot be seen as one character.

Greek mythology 
In Hesiod's Theogony, Latinus was the son of Odysseus and Circe who ruled the Tyrrhenians, presumably the Etruscans, with his brothers Ardeas and Telegonus. Latinus is also referred to, by much later authors, as the son of Pandora II and brother of Graecus, although according to Hesiod, Graecus had three brothers, Hellen, Magnetas, and Macedon, with the first being the father of Doros, Xuthos, and Aeolus. He was also depicted as the son of Odysseus and Calypso. Latinus' possible siblings were Melera and Pandorus.

Roman mythology 

In later Roman mythology (notably Virgil's Aeneid), Latinus, or Lavinius, was a king of the Latins. He is sometimes described as the son of Faunus and Marica, and father of Lavinia with his wife, Amata. He hosted Aeneas's army of exiled Trojans and offered them the chance to reorganize their life in Old Latium. His wife Amata wished his daughter Lavinia to be betrothed to Turnus, king of the Rutuli, but Latinus and the gods insisted that he give her instead to Aeneas; consequently, Turnus declared war on Aeneas and was killed two weeks into the conflict. Ascanius, the son of Aeneas, later founded Alba Longa and was the first in a long series of kings leading to Romulus and Remus, the founders of Rome.

Some suggest this version is not compatible with the Greek one: the Trojan War had ended only eight years earlier, and Odysseus only met Circe a couple of months later, so any son of the pair could only be seven years old, whereas the Roman Latinus had an adult daughter by then. The Roman Latinus from the Aeneid, son of Faunus, is a completely different person from the Greek Latinus, son of Circe and Odysseus. However, given the timing and era, it is more likely that they are in fact, the same figure.

English mythology 

The English once widely claimed as history, an original peopling of the isle — at the time a land only of fantastical giants — by descendents of the above mentioned Eneas, perhaps via Latinus, and at least with Latinus as step-family of an ancestor, though even in the time of the Renaissance, a non-English audience as well at least one English writer found details of the stories less than convincing. 

The island known later as Britain, was also previously known as Alba, similarity of name supporting connection to the city of Alba in Italy, said to have been built by Alcanius, son of Eneas, and third ruler of the Latins after Latinus, being either his grandson or step-grandson.

Even if one ignored obviously far-fetched elements of this foundation myth of Britain, Johannes Rastell writing in 1529 questioned, along these lines:  Supposing the original Brits were descendents of a line of Latin kings — Brute the son of Silvius, son Alcanius, son of Eneas who came to the Italian peninsula from Troy — then why should such a fact have escaped record in the writings of Julius Caesar when that Roman military supreme commander had personally surveyed the lands there he had conquered for Rome by 48 BC? And indeed, why should the son Brutus have escaped from Latin histories altogether, given they did deal with Silvius and Alcanius, and 'all theyr childera & what became of them & how they endyd that succeeded them as kyngis'?

Other details he found were able to be discounted without resort to factual records, or with only very few facts needed other than everyday experience. Were the early inhabitants of Britain giants, descended from the Devil in union with 32 daughters of a king Dioclisian of Syria?  To Rastell, if the devil had power to sow such seeds at the earlier time, then why not in his own time?  Where were the giants today?

Other fanciful elements he reduced by logical deduction from intuitive psychological insights, for example the greatly diminished chance of 32 daughters married to 32 kings on a single day, and all cooperating to kill those 32 husbands in a single night ; or in combination with analysis of logistical realities, such as the suggested voyage of all 32 murderous widows to Britain without dispersion or diversion, over three thousand miles.

Our renaissance writer Rastell was further able to discount the likelihood of any factuality to that ancient tale, due to his failure to discover after diligent research, any authentic record of its origin or explanation as to why such record should be absent.

Further reading 
 One surviving version of the Brut chronicle is a late middle ages manuscript, known as the St Albans Chronicle.

See also 
Latium
Latin kings of Alba Longa
Aborigines (mythology)

Notes

References 

Hard, Robin, The Routledge Handbook of Greek Mythology: Based on H.J. Rose's "Handbook of Greek Mythology", Psychology Press, 2004, . Google Books.
Livy, Ab urbe condita, 1:1-2
Virgil, Aeneid, VII, 45, 52, 69, 96.
Pseudo-Clement, Recognitions from Ante-Nicene Library Volume 8, translated by Smith, Rev. Thomas. T. & T. Clark, Edinburgh. 1867. Online version at theio.com
Publius Vergilius Maro, Aeneid. Theodore C. Williams. trans. Boston. Houghton Mifflin Co. 1910. Online version at the Perseus Digital Library.
Publius Vergilius Maro, Bucolics, Aeneid, and Georgics. J. B. Greenough. Boston. Ginn & Co. 1900. Latin text available at the Perseus Digital Library.

Etruscan heroes
Kings of Alba Longa
Characters in the Aeneid
Children of Odysseus
Latins (Italic tribe)
Children of Circe